is a public university in Takamatsu, Kagawa, Japan. The predecessor of the school was founded in 1999, and it was chartered as a university in 2004.

External links
 Official website 

Educational institutions established in 1999
Public universities in Japan
Universities and colleges in Kagawa Prefecture
1999 establishments in Japan
Takamatsu, Kagawa